In graph theory, the act of coloring generally implies the assignment of labels to vertices, edges or faces in a graph. The incidence coloring is a special graph labeling where each incidence of an edge with a vertex is assigned a color under certain constraints.

Definitions
Below G denotes a simple graph with non-empty vertex set (non-empty) V(G), edge set E(G) and maximum degree Δ(G).

Definition. An incidence is defined as a pair (v, e) where  is an end point of  In simple words, one says that vertex v is incident to edge e. Two incidences (v, e) and (u, f) are said to be adjacent or neighboring if one of the following holds:
 v = u, e ≠ f
 e = f, v ≠ u
 e = {v, u}, f = {u, w} and v ≠ w.

Definition. Let I(G) be the set of all incidences of G. An incidence coloring of G is a function  that takes distinct values on adjacent incidences (we use the simplified notation c(v, u) is used instead of c((v, e)).) The minimum number of colors needed for the incidence coloring of a graph G is known as the incidence chromatic number or incidence coloring number of G, represented by  This notation was introduced by Jennifer J. Quinn Massey and Richard A. Brualdi in 1993.

History
The concept of incidence coloring was introduced by Brualdi and Massey in 1993 who bounded it in terms of Δ(G). Initially, the incidence chromatic number of trees, complete bipartite graphs and complete graphs was found out. They also conjectured that all graphs can have an incidence coloring using Δ(G) + 2 colors (Incidence coloring conjecture - ICC). This conjecture was disproved by Guiduli, who showed that incidence coloring concept is a directed star arboricity case, introduced by Alon and Algor. His counter example showed that incidence chromatic number is at most Δ(G) + O(log Δ(G)).

Chen et al. found the incidence chromatic number of paths, fans, cycles, wheels, complete tripartite graph and adding edge wheels. Few years later, Shiu et al. showed that this conjecture is true for certain cubic graphs such as cubic Hamiltonian graphs. He showed that in case of outerplanar graph of maximum degree 4, the incidence chromatic number is not 5. The bounds for incidence chromatic number of various graph classes is found out now.

Basic results
Proposition. 

Proof. Let v be the vertex with maximum degree Δ in G. Let  be the edges that are incident with the vertex v. Consider  We can see that every pair of Δ + 1 incidences, that is,  is neighborly. Therefore, these incidences have to be colored using distinct colors.

The bound is attained by trees and complete graphs:

 If G is a complete graph with at least two vertices then 
 If G is a tree with at least two vertices then 

The main results were proved by Brualdi and Massey (1993). Shiu, Sun and Wu have proposed certain necessary conditions for graph satisfying 

 
 The incidence chromatic number of the complete bipartite graph  with m ≥ n ≥ 2, is m + 2.
  and

Incidence coloring of some graph classes

Meshes
Several algorithms are introduced to provide incidence coloring of meshes like square meshes, honeycomb meshes and hexagonal meshes. These algorithms are optimal. For each mesh, the incidence colors can be made in the linear time with the fewest colors. It is found out that ∆(G) + 1 colors are required for incidence coloring of square meshes, honeycomb meshes and hexagonal meshes.

 The incidence chromatic number of a square mesh is 5.
 The incidence chromatic number of a hexagonal mesh is 7.
 The incidence chromatic number of a honeycomb mesh is 4.

Halin graphs
Chen, Wang and Pang proved that if G is a Halin graph with ∆(G) > 4 then  For Halin graphs with ∆(G) = 3 or 4, Jing-Zhe Qu showed  to be 5 or 6 respectively. Whether the incidence coloring number of Halin graphs with low degree is Δ(G) + 1 is still an unsolved problem.

Shiu and Sun proved every cubic Halin graph other than  has an incidence coloring with Δ(G) + 2 colors. Su, Meng and Guo extended this result to all pseudo-Halin graphs.

If the Halin graph G contains a tree T, then

k-degenerated graphs
D.L. Chen, P.C.B. Lam and W.C. Shiu had conjectured that the incidence chromatic number of a cubic graph G is at most ∆(G) + 2. They proved this for certain cubic graphs such as Hamiltonian cubic graphs. A graph is said to be k-generated if for every subgraph H of G, the minimum degree of H is at most k.

 Incidence chromatic number of k-degenerated graphs G is at most ∆(G) + 2k − 1.
 Incidence chromatic number of K4 minor free graphs G is at most ∆(G) + 2 and it forms a tight bound.
 Incidence chromatic number of a planar graph G is at most ∆(G) + 7.

Outerplanar graphs

The incidence chromatic number of an outerplanar graph G is at most ∆(G) + 2. In case of outerplanar graphs with ∆(G) > 3 the incidence chromatic number is ∆(G) + 1.

Since outerplanar graphs are K4-minor-free graphs, they accept a (Δ + 2, 2)–incidence coloring. The solution for incidence chromatic number of the outerplanar graph G having Δ(G) = 3 and 2-connected outerplanar graph is still an open question.

Chordal rings
Chordal rings are variations of ring networks. The use of chordal rings in communication is very extensive due to its advantages over the interconnection networks with ring topology and other analysed structures such as meshes, hypercubes, Cayley's graphs, etc. Arden and Lee first proposed the chordal ring of degree 3, that is, the ring structured network in which every node has an extra link known as chord, to some other node in the network. Distributed loop networks are chordal rings of degree 4 which is constructed by adding 2 extra chords at every vertex in a ring network.

The chordal ring on N nodes and chord length d, denoted by CR(N,d), is a graph defined as:

These graphs are studied due to their application in communication. Kung-Fu Ding, Kung-Jui Pai and Ro-Yu Wu studied the incidence coloring of chordal rings. Several algorithms are formulated to find the incidence chromatic number of chordal rings. The major findings are:

Powers of cycles
Keaitsuda Nakprasit and Kittikorn Nakprasit studied the incidence coloring of powers of cycles,  If 2k + 1 ≥ n then  so assume n > 2k + 1 and write:

Their results can be summarized as follows:

The relation to incidence coloring conjecture is given by the observation that

Relation between incidence chromatic number and domination number of a graph
Proposition. Let G be a simple connected graph of order n, size m and domination number  Then 

Proof. Form a digraph D(G) from graph G by dividing each edge of G into 2 arcs in opposite directions. We can see that the total number of arcs in D(G) is 2m. By the definition of adjacency of arcs, an independent set of arcs in D(G) is a star forest. Therefore, a maximal independent set of arcs is a maximal star forest. This implies that at least  color classes are required.

This relation has been widely used in the characterization of (r + 1)-incidence colorable r-regular graphs. The major result on incidence coloring of r-regular graphs is: If graph G is r-regular graph, then  if and only if V(G) is a disjoint union of r + 1 dominating sets.

Interval incidence coloring
Definition. A finite subset  is an interval if and only if it contains all the numbers between its minimum and its maximum.

Definition. Let c to be an incidence coloring of G and define

An interval incidence coloring of G is an incidence coloring c such that for each vertex v of G the set  is an interval. The interval incidence coloring number of G is the minimum number of colors used for the interval incidence coloring of G. It is denoted by  It is clear that  If only  colors are used for the interval incidence coloring, then it is said to be minimal.

The concept of interval incidence coloring was introduced by A. Malafiejska, R. Janczewski and M. Malafiejski. They proved  for bipartite graphs. In case of regular bipartite graphs equality holds. Subcubic bipartite graphs admit an interval incidence coloring using four, five or six colors. They have also proved incidence 5-colorability can be decided in linear time for bipartite graphs with ∆(G) = 4.

Fractional incidence coloring
The fractional version of the incidence coloring was first introduced by Yang in 2007. An r-tuple incidence k-coloring of a graph G is the assignment of r colors to each incidence of graph G from a set of k colors such that the adjacent incidences are given disjoint sets of colors. By definition, it is obvious that 1-tuple incidence k-coloring is an incidence k-coloring too.

The fractional incidence chromatic number of graph G is the infimum of the fractions  in such a way that G admits a r-tuple incidence k-coloring. Fractional incidence coloring has great applications in several fields of computer science. Based on incidence coloring results by Guiduli, Yang has proved that the fractional incidence chromatic number of any graph is at most Δ(G) + 20 log Δ(G) + 84. He has also proved the existence of graphs with fractional incidence chromatic number at least Δ(G) + Ω(log Δ(G)).

Nordhaus–Gaddum inequality
Let G be a graph with n vertices such that  where  denotes the complement of G. Then  These bounds are sharp for all values of n.

Incidence coloring game
Incidence coloring game was first introduced by S. D. Andres. It is the incidence version of the vertex coloring game, in which the incidences of a graph are colored instead of vertices. Incidence game chromatic number is the new parameter defined as a game-theoretic analogous of the incidence chromatic number.

The game is that two players, Alice and Bob construct a proper incidence coloring. The rules are stated below:
 Alice and Bob color the incidences of a graph G with a set k of colors.
 They are taking turns to provide a proper coloring to an uncolored incidence. Generally, Alice begins.
 In the case of an incidence that cannot be colored properly, then Bob wins.
 If every incidences of the graph is colored properly, Alice wins.

It unifies the ideas of incidence chromatic number of a graph and game chromatic number in case of an undirected graph. This bound was improved to 2Δ + 3k − 1 in case of graphs in which Δ is at least 5k. The incidence game chromatic number of stars, cycles, and sufficiently large wheels are also determined. John Y. Kim (2011) has found out the exact incidence game chromatic number of large paths and has given a correct proof of a result stated by Andres concerning the exact incidence game chromatic number of large wheels.

References

Additional links
 .
 .
 .
 .
 .
 .
 .
 .
 .
 .
 .
 .
 .
 .
 .
 .
 .
 .
 
 .
 .
 .
 .
 .
 .
 .
 .

See also 
 L(h, k)-coloring
 Harmonious coloring
 Star coloring
 Total coloring
 Circular coloring
 Path coloring
 Defective coloring
 Radio coloring
 Acyclic coloring

Graph coloring